The men's 400 metres hurdles at the 2003 All-Africa Games were held on October 13–14.

Medalists

Results

Heats
Qualification: First 3 of each heat (Q) and the next 2 fastest (q) qualified for the semifinal.

Wind:Heat 1: -0.2 m/s, Heat 2: -0.2 m/s

Final

References

Results
Results

400